John Millington (11 May 1779 – 1868) was an English engineer who became an academic in the USA.

He was a licensed attorney in England before he began his engineering career. He served as professor of mechanics at the Royal Institution from 1817 to 1829 and in 1825 he delivered the inaugural Royal Institution Christmas Lecture. In 1827 he was announced as Professor of Engineering and the Application of Mechanical Philosophy to the Arts at the new London University (now University College London), but decided not to take up the position after a dispute with the college over pay. He then worked as an engineer with the Anglo-Mexican Mining Association in 1829.

Millington served as Professor of Chemistry and Natural Philosophy at the College of William and Mary from 1836-1848, Professor of Chemistry and Natural Science at the University of Mississippi. He obtained a doctoral degree in medicine and served as Professor at the Memphis Medical College.

References

English mechanical engineers
1779 births
1868 deaths
University of Mississippi faculty
College of William & Mary faculty
British emigrants to the United States